Phyllonorycter achilleus is a moth   of the family Gracillariidae. It is found in the Albertine Rift and the Kakamega Forest in western Kenya. The habitat consists of tropical rainforests where Guineo-Congolian flora intermixes with savannah plants at altitudes above 1,500 meters.

The length of the forewings is 4.3 mm for males and 3.2 mm for females. The forewings  are elongate and the ground colour is orange-ochreous with a shiny white and dark brown pattern. The hindwings are narrow, elongate and pointed with a fuscous ground colour. Adults are on wing in early April and mid-October.

The larvae feed as leaf miners on Prunus africana.

Etymology
The species name is derived from the Greek mythological hero of the Trojan War, Achilleus (Achilles). This name also honours the late Achiel and Maria De Keyser.

References

Endemic moths of Kenya
Moths described in 2012
achilleus
Moths of Africa

Taxa named by Jurate de Prins
Leaf miners